NGC 4627 is a dwarf elliptical galaxy in the constellation Canes Venatici.

References

External links
 
 

Elliptical galaxies
Dwarf elliptical galaxies
Peculiar galaxies
Interacting galaxies
NGC 4631 Group
Canes Venatici
4627
07860
42620